The 1976 Island Holidays Classic, also known as the Hawaii Open, was a men's tennis tournament played an outdoor hard courts in Maui, Hawaii, in the United States. It was the third edition of the tournament and was held from October 4 through October 10, 1976. The tournament was part of the Grand Prix tennis circuit and categorized as 3 star event. Unseeded Harold Solomon won the singles title.

Finals

Singles
 Harold Solomon defeated  Bob Lutz 6–3, 5–7, 7–5
 It was Solomon's 4th singles title of the year and the 9th of his career.

Doubles
 Raymond Moore /  Allan Stone defeated  Dick Stockton /  Roscoe Tanner 6–7, 6–3, 6–4

References

Hawaii Open
Hawaii Open
Hawaii Open
Hawaii Open